Caroline Paget may refer to:

Caroline Campbell, Duchess of Argyll (1774-1835),  wife of Henry Paget, future Marquess of Anglesey, until their divorce in 1810, and subsequently the wife of George Campbell, 6th Duke of Argyll, a friend of her first husband.
Lady Caroline Paget (1913–1973), daughter of Charles Paget, 6th Marquess of Anglesey and Lady Victoria Manners, eldest daughter of the 8th Duke of Rutland.